Flechas Azules Division was a division of the Nationalist forces during the Spanish Civil War. The name means "Blue Arrows" in Spanish.

It was created when the Flechas Azules Mixed Brigade was expanded into two division-sized units; the Flechas Azules and Flechas Verdes Divisions. The Flechas Azules Division served in the Catalonia Offensive, the final offensive of the Spanish Civil War. Italians from the Corpo Truppe Volontarie served in these mixed Italo-Spanish Flechas (Arrows) units where the Italians provided the officers and technical personnel, while the Spanish served in the rank-and-file.

Order of battle

Division Flechas Azules - Col. Francesco La Ferla
 1st Regiment
 1st Battalion "Cerro Toro"
 2nd Battalion "Sierra Lazaro"
 3rd Battalion "Sierra Alteruela"
 Battery of 65/17
 2nd Regiment
 1st Battalion "Sierra Avila"
 2nd Battalion "Sierra Argallen"
 3rd Battalion "Maggiore Roccio"
 Rifle Battalion
 Battalion de maquinas
 1st Machinegun Company
 2nd Machinegun Company
 3rd Machinegun Company
 4th Mortar Company
 Anti Tank Company 47/35
 Artillery Regiment
 Group of 65/17
 Group of 75/27
 Group of 100/17
 20mm AA Battery
 Machinegun Company
 Engineer Company
 Radio Company
 Services Unit

See also
 Flechas Negras Division

Sources
de Mesa, José Luis, El regreso de las legiones: (la ayuda militar italiana a la España nacional, 1936–1939),  García Hispán, Granada:España, 1994 

Military units and formations of the Spanish Civil War
Divisions of Italy in the Spanish Civil War
Military units and formations established in 1937